The term brains trust (originally plural, the s is now usually dropped in American English) may refer to:

 Brain Trust, a close group of advisors, including those who advised United States President Franklin D. Roosevelt
 Brain Trust (GetBackers), a secret organization from the anime/manga GetBackers
 Brain Trust (Wild Cards), a character from the book series Wild Cards
 Braintrust: What Neuroscience Tells Us about Morality, a 2011 book by Patricia Churchland
 Brain Trust, a 2-11 TV pilot produced by Dean Devlin
 A group led by the Janitor in the TV series Scrubs
 A group of villains in Batman Beyond
 The Brains Trust, a British radio/television programme

See also 
 Brain Research Trust, a British medical research charity